Sam (Serbian Cyrillic: Сам; trans. Alone) is the second studio album from former Yugoslav and Serbian hard rock/heavy metal band Osvajači.

Track listing
All the songs were written by Zvonko Pantović (lyrics) and Dragan Urošević (music).
"Duša kad izneveri" – 3:47
"Kad me ostave svi" – 3:41
"Zla noć" – 4:03
"S kim čekaš dan" – 4:18
"Maska" - 4:07
"Tiha predaja" – 3:10
"Vreme za ludake" – 3:20
"Iz sve snage" – 3:24
"Pesma za kraj" – 3:41

Personnel
Zvonko Pantović - vocals
Dragan Urošević - guitar
Nebojša Jakovljević - keyboard
Saša Popović - bass guitar
Miša Raca - drums

Guest musicians
Laza Ristovski - keyboard
Jelisaveta Stamenković - backing vocals
Ana Spasić - backing vocals
Mijo Babalj - backing vocals
Slobodan Ljubisavljević - backing vocals

Covers
Serbian progressive/power metal band AlogiA released a cover of "Maska" on their 2006 live album Priče o vremenu i životu - Live at SKC. Dragan Urošević made a guest appearance on the song.

References
 EX YU ROCK enciklopedija 1960-2006,  Janjatović Petar;  

Osvajači albums
1995 albums
PGP-RTS albums